{{Speciesbox
|name = Dolomite fuchsia bush
|image = Eremophila christopheri flowers.jpg
|image_caption = 
|status_system = 
|status = 
|genus = Eremophila (plant)
|species = christophori
|authority = F.Muell.
|synonyms_ref = 
|synonyms = 
 Bondtia christophori Kuntze orth. var.
 Bontia christopheri (F.Muell.) Kuntze
 Eremophila castelli-arminii  E.Pritz.
 Eremophila christophorii Barlow  orth. var.
 Pholidia christopheri (F.Muell.) Kraenzl.
}}Eremophila christophori, commonly known as dolomite fuchsia bush, is a flowering plant in the figwort family, Scrophulariaceae and is endemic to the southern part of the Northern Territory in Australia. It is an erect shrub with bright green leaves and white, pink or lilac flowers.

The leaves are arranged alternately along the stems and more or less overlap each other.

The flowers are borne singly in leaf axils and lack a stalk. The petal tube is white, blue, or a shade of pink to lilac-coloured, covered on the outside with short hairs while the inside is filled with spidery hairs.

Taxonomy and namingEremophila christophori was first formally described by Ferdinand von Mueller in 1875 and the description was published in Fragmenta phytographiae Australiae. The specific epithet (christophori) honours Christopher Giles, the collector of the type specimen.

Distribution and habitat
This eremophila occurs in a band extending east north east from the MacDonnell Ranges west of Alice Springs to the border with Queensland where it grows in sandy soils often over laterite or limestone on low hills.

Conservation statusEremophila christophori is listed as "of least concern" by the Northern Territory Parks and Wildlife Conservation Act.

Use in horticulture
This eremophila is rarely without flowers in the garden. It is hardy and some specimens have been in cultivation for more than 30 years. It can be propagated from cuttings or grafted onto Myoporum''. Although it prefers well drained soil it will grow in heavier soils to produce a more open plant. It is drought hardy, tolerates light frost and is fast growing in well-drained soil in a sunny position.

See also

Plants using Giles names

References

christophori
Flora of the Northern Territory
Plants described in 1875
Taxa named by Ferdinand von Mueller